Keimneh (also Romanized as Kīmneh; also known as Kaimina, Keymaneh, and Kīmāneh) is a village in Sirvan Rural District, Nowsud District, Paveh County, Kermanshah Province, Iran. At the 2006 census, its population was 151, in 39 families.

References 

Bidarvaz is inccorect name of Berwas village .

Populated places in Paveh County